Mikhailo Aleksandrovich Olelkovich (executed on August 30, 1481 in Vilnius) was a Ruthenian noble from the Olelkovich family of the Grand Duchy of Lithuania. He was the brother of Prince Simeon Olelkovich of Kiev and cousin of Grand Prince Ivan III of Moscow. Mikhailo was allegedly involved both in bringing the Judaizer Heresy to Novgorod and the failed defection of the city to the Grand Duchy of Lithuania in 1471. He also organized a coup against Casimir IV Jagiellon, King of Poland and Grand Duke of Lithuania, but was discovered and executed in 1481. Mikhailo's son Semen continued the family line.

Novgorod affair

According to the 1456 Treaty of Yazhelbitsy, the Novgorod Republic became dependent on the Grand Duchy of Moscow was not allowed to conduct independent foreign policy. In a bid to regain independence, Novgorod began negotiations for an anti-Muscovite alliance with Casimir IV Jagiellon, Grand Duke of Lithuania. It was alleged in an account purportedly drawn up in the archiepiscopal scriptorium in the mid-1470s that Mikhailo, as regent for Casimir IV, arrived in Novgorod initially to marry Marfa Boretskaya, the matriarch of the pro-Lithuanian faction in the city (or else to have her married to an unnamed Lithuanian nobleman). Moscow accused Novgorod not only of violation of a political treaty, but also of religious treachery: there were also allegations that the marriage would have brought Novgorod over to Catholicism, but Gail Lenhoff and Janet Martin argue that the pro-Lithuanian, pro-Catholic allegations are highly suspect and, indeed, very unlikely. Mikhailo was Orthodox (as was Marfa Boretskaya) and he and his brother had strong differences of opinion with Casimir IV Jagiellon. Mikhailo entered Novgorod on November 8, 1470 with a large retinue and remained in the city until March 15, 1471. His large retinue included Skhariya (Zechariah) the Jew, who gained a following in Novgorod.  The heresy spread from there to Moscow in 1479 when Grand Prince Ivan III transferred several heretical priests to Moscow. The affair ended when Mikhailo withdrew from the city and Ivan III defeated the Novgorodians in the Battle of Shelon in July 1471. In 1478, Moscow took direct control of the city.

Coup of 1481
After the death of his brother Simeon in 1470, the Principality of Kiev was converted into the Kiev Voivodeship and was governed by appointed officials (voivodes). This was a serious setback to the Olelkovich family as it claimed the principality as their possession since Mikhailo's grandfather Vladimir, son of Algirdas. The loss of Kyiv could be attributed to Olelkovich's faith (Eastern Orthodoxy rather than Catholicism) and their close kinship with the Grand Princes of Moscow, who threatened Lithuania's eastern borders. For example, in 1479 Mikhailo acted as intermediary in arranging the marriage of Ivan the Young, son of Ivan III, and Elena, daughter of Stephen III of Moldavia. Disappointed by the Lithuanian politics, Mikhailo Olelkovich organized opposition to Casimir IV. In 1481, he together with relatives Iwan Olshanski-Dubrovicki and Feodor Ivanovich Belsky organized a coup against the Grand Duke. However, the plot was discovered, possibly by voivode of Kiev Ivan Chodkiewicz, and Mikhailo and Iwan were executed. Feodor managed to escape to the Grand Duchy of Moscow.

Mikhailo and twelve other Ruthenian nobles signed a letter to Pope Sixtus IV in 1476, authored by Miseal (Misail Pstruch), Metropolitan of Kiev. The letters expressed loyalty to the Council of Florence and supported a church union between Catholicism and Eastern Orthodoxy. It also contained complains that the Catholics were discriminating the Orthodoxs and asked the Pope for protection. There are doubts whether the letter was authentic and not a later forgery.

Ancestry

References

External links
 Mykhailo Olelkovych at the Encyclopedia of Ukraine

1481 deaths
Gediminids
Politicians from Vilnius
People from medieval Novgorod
Year of birth unknown
15th-century Lithuanian people